The 2nd constituency of Cantal is a French legislative constituency in the Cantal département.  It is currently represented by Jean-Yves Bony of The Republicans (LR).

It was formerly the electoral base of the 2nd President of the Fifth French Republic, Georges Pompidou, (1969–74).

Historic representation

Election results

2022

2017

2012

2007

2002

 
 
 
 
 
 
 
 
|-
| colspan="8" bgcolor="#E9E9E9"|
|-

1997

References

Sources
 French Interior Ministry results website: 

French legislative constituencies of Cantal